Todd G. Sears is an American businessman and advocate for LGBTQ+ equality. He is the founder and CEO of Out Leadership, the world’s premier global platform used by business to drive equality. Out Leadership connects leaders across the world’s most influential industries to foster business growth, cultivate talent, and drive equality forward, and currently counts 98 of the world’s most powerful companies as its members. Previously he and served as Head of Diversity Strategy at Merrill Lynch and Head of Diversity and Inclusion at Credit Suisse.

Career
For his education, Sears attended Woodberry Forest School in Virginia, before graduating from Duke University in 1998.

Sears began working at Merrill Lynch in 2001, where he created the first national team of financial advisors on Wall Street to focus on the LGBT community. While at Merrill Lynch, he produced seminars that addressed the challenges LGBT clients face in estate-planning and his team expanded to include 10 financial advisors in six cities. Under Sears, the team generated $1.4 billion over four years. Sears worked at Credit Suisse after Merrill Lynch, and became the head of diversity and inclusion. While at Credit Suisse, Sears created the first Veteran's Network on Wall Street.

Sears founded Out on the Street, a group which works to increase LGBTQ+ awareness at financial firms and Out in Law, which focuses on the legal industry. In 2011, Sears founded Out Leadership in order to harness the power of business to advance LGBTQ+ equality worldwide.  

Out Leadership acts as a strategic consulting firm, helping companies embed LGBTQ+ equality in their business practices, from gender-inclusive parental leave policies to incorporating equality-forward investments in corporate ESG strategies. Out Leadership also operates three talent programs: OutNEXT fostering standout LGBTQ+ talent early in their careers), OutWOMEN+ (creating space for LGBTQ+ women, non-binary, and trans people to develop their talent and networks, as LGBTQ+ programs tend to be dominated by cisgender gay men), and OutQUORUM (accelerating the placement of LGBTQ+ people on corporate boards using new, proprietary research). Out Leadership also leverages the power of its nearly 100 member firms to advocate for LGBTQ+ equality globally, including initiatives to end sodomy laws and conversion therapy around the globe. 

Sears serves on various nonprofit boards, including the Williams Institute of UCLA, the Palette Fund, the Global Equality Fund of the U.S. Department of State, Lambda Legal Defense & Education Fund, The North Carolina Community Foundation and the National Advisory Council of the Stonewall National Archives & Museum. Additionally, he is the founding chair of Jeffrey Fashion Cares, which raised over $8mm for LGBTQ+/HIV causes over the decade he led it.

References

American LGBT businesspeople
Duke University alumni
Year of birth missing (living people)
Living people
American LGBT rights activists